Braynner Yesid Garcia Leal (born 6 September 1986) is a Colombian football defender. He currently plays for Unión Magdalena in the Colombian Primera A.

Career

Unión Magdalena
In December 2019, García joined Categoría Primera B club Unión Magdalena for the 2020 season.

References

External links
 
 

1986 births
Living people
Colombian footballers
Colombian expatriate footballers
Colombia international footballers
Association football defenders
Cúcuta Deportivo footballers
Atlético Bucaramanga footballers
Atlético Junior footballers
Águilas Doradas Rionegro players
Club Universitario de Deportes footballers
Unión Magdalena footballers
Categoría Primera A players
Categoría Primera B players
Peruvian Primera División players
Colombian expatriate sportspeople in Peru
Expatriate footballers in Peru
People from Norte de Santander Department